Andy Davidson may refer to:

Andy Davidson (footballer) (1932–2014), Hull City appearance record holder
Andy Davidson (game designer), British video game designer
Andy Davidson (Torchwood), a fictional character on the BBC science fiction series Torchwood, portrayed by actor Tom Price
Andy Davidson, author of The Boatman's Daughter

See also
Andrew Davidson (disambiguation)